Nikolina Zadravec (born 2 September 1997) is a Croatian handball player for RK Podravka and the Croatian national team.

She participated at the 2016 European Women's Handball Championship.

References

External links

1997 births
Living people
Croatian female handball players
Sportspeople from Čakovec
RK Podravka Koprivnica players